The IV International Chopin Piano Competition was held from 15 September to 15 October 1949 in Warsaw. The first competition after World War II, it was held in connection with the centenary of Chopin's death. Polish pianist Halina Czerny-Stefańska and Soviet pianist Bella Davidovich shared first place. Due to the wartime destruction of the National Philharmonic, the auditions were held at the Roma Theatre on Nowogrodzka Street.

Awards 

The competition consisted of two elimination stages and a final with 18 pianists. For the first time, competitors performed a piano concerto in its entirety in the final, as opposed to just two movements.

The following prizes were awarded:

One special prize was awarded:

Jury 
The jury consisted of:
  Godfrid Boon
  
  Lucette Descaves (substitute)
  Sem Dresden
  Zbigniew Drzewiecki (chairman)
  Jan Ekier
  Blas Galindo Dimas
  Lélia Gousseau (substitute)
  Arthur Hedley (vice-chairman)
  
  Franz Josef Hirt
  Jan Hoffman
  
  Marcelina Kimonti-Jacynowa (substitute)
  Lazare Lévy
  Marguerite Long (vice-chairwoman, after 1 October)
  Joseph Marx
  Frantisek Maxian (vice-chairman)
  Alfred Mendelssohn
  Dimitar Nenov
  Lev Oborin (vice-chairman) ( I)
  Pavel Serebryakov
  Stanisław Szpinalski ( I)
  
  Magda Tagliaferro (vice-chairwoman)
  
  Bolesław Woytowicz
  Carlo Zecchi
  Jerzy Żurawlew

During the first two rounds, blind auditions were held, with participants competing anonymously under numbers they had drawn, as the jury listened behind wooden shutters. This format was not repeated again in subsequent editions of the competition.

References

Further reading

External links 
 

 

International Chopin Piano Competition
1949 in music
1949 in Poland
1940s in Warsaw